The Fujifilm X-M1 is a digital mirrorless interchangeable-lens camera  in the Fujifilm X-series announced  on June 25, 2013.

The X-M1 uses Fujifilm's X-Trans CMOS sensor, while the near-identical sister model, the X-A1 uses a Bayer filter. This image sensor uses a less regular pattern of colors, allowing the sensor to omit an anti-aliasing filter.  

The X-M1 has an articulating screen.

References

X-M1
Cameras introduced in 2013